In modern usage, diopter or dioptre is a measure of the refractive power of an optical system.

Diopter may also refer to:
Historically, a dioptric lens
Any lens system, such as a telescope
A diopter sight
A close-up lens used in photography
A theodolite or similar surveyor's angle measuring device
A dioptra, an old surveying device
An alidade
A surgical speculum
An instrument for drawing the skull by projections

See also
Dioptrice
Dioptrics